Otto John Jelinek  (Czech: Otakar Jelínek; born May 20, 1940) is a businessman, former figure skater, and Canadian politician. Jelinek's family fled to Switzerland, then to Canada from Czechoslovakia in 1948, following the Communist coup d'état when communists nationalized his father's cork and aluminium caps factory. Jelinek was appointed as ambassador of Canada to the Czech Republic in August 2013.

Figure skating career

 J = Junior level
Jelinek competed as a pair skater with his sister, Maria. They are the 1962 World Champions, the 1961 North American national champions, and 1961-1962 Canadian national champions. They represented Canada at the 1960 Winter Olympics, where they placed 4th.

After they won the World Championships in 1962, the Jelineks retired from competition, and toured professionally with Ice Capades.  In late 1963, Jelinek became engaged to Darlene Streich, an American ice dancer who went on to win the U.S. Championships in that discipline in 1964.

The Jelineks were inducted into Canada's Sports Hall of Fame in 1962 and into the Skate Canada Hall of Fame in 1994.

Political career

After retiring from professional skating, Jelinek started a business, Canadian Skate Industries, to manufacture figure and hockey skates for the mass market.  He also had considerable investments in real estate.

After a time in business, Otto Jelinek entered politics and was elected in the 1972 election to the House of Commons as the Progressive Conservative Member of Parliament (MP) for High Park-Humber Valley in Metropolitan Toronto. He was re-elected in 1974. In 1979, he switched to the riding of Halton, where he ran and won in the 1979 federal election.

When the Tories formed government after the 1984 election, Prime Minister Brian Mulroney appointed Jelinek to Cabinet as Minister of State for Fitness and Amateur Sport, and the Minister responsible for Multiculturalism.

In 1988, he was named Minister of Supply and Services, and later, Minister of National Revenue. Jelinek was returned to Parliament in the 1988 federal election in Oakville—Milton left politics after Mulroney retired and did not run in the 1993 election. In 2013, he was appointed as ambassador of Canada to the Czech Republic.

Business career
In 1994, he moved to the Czech Republic, and became chairman of the Board of Directors of Deloitte & Touche Central Europe, and chairman and managing partner of the firm in the Czech Republic, a position he held until 2006. In 2007, Jelinek assumed the role of chairman of Colliers International, CEE Region. Jelinek was also a chairman of the society Olympiad for Czech Republic, which led the activities of Prague to become the host city of the 2020 Summer Olympics.

In 2011, Jelinek became a Managing Partner with Passport Energy, a Canadian oil and gas company, with responsibility for corporate and financial affairs in Europe.

References

Further reading

External links

 
 
 

1940 births
Living people
Canadian sportsperson-politicians
Canadian male pair skaters
Canadian people of Czech descent
Canadian Protestants
Czechoslovak emigrants to Canada
Figure skaters from Toronto
Figure skaters at the 1960 Winter Olympics
Members of the 24th Canadian Ministry
Members of the House of Commons of Canada from Ontario
Members of the King's Privy Council for Canada
Politicians from Toronto
Olympic figure skaters of Canada
Figure skaters from Prague
Progressive Conservative Party of Canada MPs
World Figure Skating Championships medalists
Ambassadors of Canada to the Czech Republic